Mount Malakatyn-Tas is a mountain on Kotelny Island, part of the New Siberian Islands north of the East Siberian Plain, Russia.

The area of the mountain is part of the Lena Delta Wildlife Reserve.

Geography
At 374 meters tall, it is the highest point of the Anzhu group, as well as the New Siberian Islands.

See also
List of mountains and hills of Russia

References

Mountains of the Sakha Republic
Anzhu Islands